Tanahmerah Bay, or Tanah Merah Bay, ("red soil bay") is a bay on the north coast of New Guinea, in Jayapura Regency, Papua, Indonesia, about 50 km northwest of the provincial capital of Jayapura.

During World War II, Jayapura (then Hollandia) area was a Japanese army and air force base. On 22 April 1944, two regiments of the 24th Infantry Division landed in Tanamerah Bay, as part of the Operation Reckless. Subsequently, the area became an Allied base, Naval Base Hollandia, supporting further actions in the Southwest Pacific, and the invasion of the Philippines.

See also
 Port of Depapre, an under-construction seaport located inside the bay

References

External links
 Tanahmerah Bay

Bays of Indonesia
Western New Guinea
Landforms of Papua (province)